Tamara Walker (born May 1, 1966) is a former singer-songwriter. Walker began her career as Miss Maryland where she placed in the Top 10 at the Miss America pageant.

In 2000 she signed with Curb Records. She also signed a publishing deal with Sony Tree. Initially, Walker recorded country music, but the label decided to release her to the Pop AC market . Subsequently, her first single went to country radio but the country album went unreleased. Then, in 2001, Curb Records released her debut album, Angel Eyes, and she charted three singles on the Billboard Hot Adult Contemporary Tracks chart. The title track of her debut album was the theme song to the 2001 Jennifer Lopez film, Angel Eyes. After leaving music behind, she shifted her career to real estate, working as a Douglas Elliman agent as of late 2018.

Discography

Albums

Singles

Music videos

References

1964 births
American women country singers
American country singer-songwriters
Living people
Singer-songwriters from Maryland
21st-century American businesspeople
21st-century American singers
21st-century American women singers
Country musicians from Maryland
American real estate brokers
Businesspeople from Maryland
21st-century American businesswomen